Paranoia e Potere (in English Paranoia and Power) is the first official album of the Italian band Punkreas.

Made up of thirteen new songs, Paranoia e Potere became the album which introduced Punkreas in the mainstream Italian punk scene. The album was recorded in a month in analogue. The low quality of the technology made the sound more rough and hard, making the album more hardcore.

Track listing
"Falsi preoccupati" - 2:36
"I chiromanti" - 2:35
"Sfratto" - 2:44
"L'orologio" - 2:40
"Venduto (3x2)" - 2:59
"Tutti in pista" - 3:39
"Acà toro" - 3:20
"Cadena perpetua" - 2:59
"La canzone del bosco" - 3:13
"Aidid" - 2:43
"Anacronistico" - 3:16
"Marte" - 2:31
"La grande danza" - 3:22

Personnel
 Cippa - Vocals
 Noyse - Guitar
 Flaco - Guitar
 Paletta - Bass
 Gagno - Drums

References

1995 albums
Punkreas albums